Olsztyn Główny (Polish for Olsztyn Main station) is a railway station of Olsztyn, Warmian-Masurian Voivodeship, Poland. According to the classification of passenger stations in Poland, it belongs to Voivodeship station. In 2018, the station served approximately 7,900 passengers a day.

History

The construction of the Main Railway Station in Olsztyn was completed on December 1, 1872. In 1907 a tram connection connected the train station with city center. Since 1936 or 1937 the station was called Allenstein Hbf, previously it was only called Allenstein. The old tram lines were closed in 1967. In 2015 a new tram line was opened.

During the World War II, the station burned down. The reconstruction and modernization of the destroyed building was completed in 1948, the new station served the city for twenty years, after which it was dismantled. The current building was put into use in 1971.

Future plans
Plans exist to demolish current building and replace it with new infrastructure.

Train services
The station is served by the following service(s):

Intercity services (IC) Szczecin - Koszalin - Słupsk - Lebork - Gdynia - Gdańsk - Malbork - Elbląg/Iława - Olsztyn
Intercity services (IC) Olsztyn - Warszawa - Skierniewice - Łódź
Intercity services (IC) Olsztyn - Warszawa - Skierniewice - Częstochowa - Katowice - Bielsko-Biała
Intercity services (IC) Olsztyn - Warszawa - Skierniewice - Częstochowa - Katowice - Gliwice - Racibórz
Regional services (R) Gdynia Chylonia — Olsztyn Główny

References

External links
 

Railway stations in Poland opened in 1872
Railway stations in Warmian-Masurian Voivodeship
Buildings and structures in Olsztyn